Kazazov is a rural locality (a khutor) in Pchegatlukayskoye Rural Settlement of Teuchezhsky District, the Republic of Adygea, Russia. The population was 274 as of 2018. There are 13 streets.

Geography 
Kazazov is located 18 km west of Ponezhukay (the district's administrative centre) by road. Adygeysk is the nearest rural locality.

References 

Rural localities in Teuchezhsky District